The Williams FW10 is a Formula One car designed by Frank Dernie for use by the Williams team in the 1985 Formula One World Championship. It was powered by a Honda RA165E V6 turbo engine and driven by Briton Nigel Mansell and Finn Keke Rosberg. An upgraded version of the car, dubbed the FW10B, was introduced late in the season, which enabled the team to win the final three races of the year.

Concept

1985 marked Williams' second full season with Honda turbo power.  had been difficult, as the FW09 struggled to cope with the enormous power and brutal torque curve, leading to handling problems which afflicted drivers Keke Rosberg and Jacques Laffite throughout the season. Technical director Patrick Head thus decided to make the FW10 an all-new car- making the monocoque entirely from much stiffer carbon composite, rather than the aluminium honeycomb construction of previous years - the first Williams F1 car ever to be made predominantly of this material. In total, nine FW10 tubs were built; one was sent to Japan for Honda test driver Satoru Nakajima to drive, and one was a prototype to test the construction process.

Racing history
The team had a much better season than in the previous two years, scoring four wins and taking third place in the Constructors' Championship. During the early part of the season the cars made do with upgraded 1984 engines. Honda introduced a completely new RA165-E engine at Montreal, which had smaller turbos (with a very small drop-off in power which was recovered thanks to improved engine and turbo technology), and instantly the cars were on the pace, with both Rosberg and Mansell expressing delight in the power of the new engine and how much easier it was to drive being less 'peaky' with a much smoother power delivery. Rosberg won in Detroit, whilst further developments to the engine in the final stages of the season saw the FW10B win the final three races of the season which allowed Williams to snatch third place in the Constructors' Championship on a count-back from Lotus.

Mansell, having joined the team from Lotus at the beginning of the year, took his first F1 victory on home soil at Brands Hatch for the European Grand Prix, and immediately followed it up with his second, in South Africa. Rosberg then took his second win of the season, and his fifth and final victory overall, at the last race of the season in Australia.

This record would stand until . Rosberg's achievement was made more impressive by the fact that he was running on slick qualifying tyres at a time when the track was damp from light rain, and he also had a deflating tyre for most of the lap.

Autocourse picked the FW10 as the third-best car of 1985, behind the Lotus 97T and the McLaren MP4/2B, and the chassis also won Autosport magazine's "racing car of the year" award.

The FW10 was the first Williams car to sport the distinctive yellow, blue and white livery that the team would use until the end of the  season.

Complete Formula One results
(key) (Results in bold indicate pole position; results in italics indicate fastest lap.)

References

Books

1985 Formula One season cars
Williams Formula One cars